The Field Hockey at the 2018 INAS European Championship Games was the 1st edition of the 2018 INAS European Championship Games. It took place from the 17th until the 18th of July 2018 in Paris, France.

Qualified teams

Format
The five teams will be put in one group and each team will play the other four teams. The top two teams advance to the final to determine the winner. The bottom three teams play in a new group for the bronze medal. The teams are mixed with boys and girls. Each game lasts for 30 min, with each game consisting of two halves each lasting 15 minutes.

Results
All times are local (UTC+2).

Preliminary round

Pool A

Third to Fifth place classification

Bronze Pool
The points obtained in the preliminary round against the other team are taken over.

Final

Final standings

References

2018 in French sport
2018 in Paris
International sports competitions hosted by Paris
July 2018 sports events in France